Salon de l'Automobile may refer to:

 Geneva Motor Show
 Paris Motor Show